The Sun Legende 41 is a French sailboat that was designed by American Doug Peterson as a cruiser-racer and first built in 1984. The design was based upon a prototype International Offshore Rule One Ton class racer, named Legende.

In 1990 the design was developed into the Sun Fast 41.

Production
The design was built by Jeanneau in France in the United States, from 1984 to 1994, with 580 boats completed.

Design
The Sun Legende 41 is a recreational keelboat, built predominantly of fiberglass, with wood trim. The hull is made from hand-laid polyester fiberglass, with an option of Kevlar reinforcement (Aramat K), while the deck is made of a fiberglass-balsa sandwich. It has a masthead sloop rig, with a keel-stepped mast, one set of unswept spreaders and aluminum spars. The hull has a raked stem, a reverse transom, an internally mounted spade-type rudder controlled by a wheel and a fixed fin keel, deep draft keel or stub keel and retractable centerboard.

The boat is fitted with an inboard  diesel engine for docking and maneuvering.

The design typically has sleeping accommodation for six people in three cabins, with a double "V"-berth in the bow cabin, two straight settees in the main cabin and two aft cabins with double berth. The galley is located on the port side at the companionway ladder. The galley is "U"-shaped and is equipped with a two-burner stove, an icebox and a double sink. A navigation station is opposite the galley, on the starboard side. The forward head is located just aft of the bow cabin on the port side, while there is also an aft head. The "team" version has four cabins.

Variants
Sun Legende 41 Fin Keel
This model displaces  and carries  of cast iron ballast.
Sun Legende 41 Regatta
This racing-oriented model has a taller mast, a deeper keel and increased sail area. It displaces  and carries  of lead ballast.
Sun Legende 41 Centerboard
This model displaces  and carries  of ballast, consisting of cast iron exterior ballast and a steel centerboard.

Operational history
The boat was at one time supported by an active class club that organized racing events, the One Ton class.

See also
List of sailing boat types

References

External links

Keelboats
1980s sailboat type designs
Sailing yachts
Sailboat type designs by Doug Peterson
Sailboat types built by Jeanneau